David Hayes Agnew (November 24, 1818March 22, 1892) was an American surgeon.

Biography 
Agnew was born on November 24, 1818, Nobleville, Pennsylvania (present-day Christiana). His parents were Robert Agnew and Agnes Noble. Agnew grew up as a Christian. He was surrounded by a family of doctors and had always known he was going to become a physician. As a young boy, he had a sharp sense of humor and was very intelligent.

He was educated at Jefferson College, and at Delaware College in Newark, Delaware. He graduated from the University of Pennsylvania School of Medicine on April 6, 1838. He returned to Nobleville to help his father in his clinic. He worked there for two years. His father was an asthmatic and moved to Maryland in 1840 because the climate was more suited to his condition. Agnew moved with him. On November 21, 1841, he married Margaret Irwin. In 1852, he bought and revived the Philadelphia School of Anatomy. He held responsibility for ten years until 1862. During the American Civil War he was consulting surgeon in the Mower Army Hospital, near Philadelphia, and acquired a considerable reputation for his operations in cases of gunshot wounds. On December 21, 1863, he became the Demonstrator of Anatomy and Assistant Lecturer on Clinical Surgery at The University of Pennsylvania. Later, he was requested to assist the Professor of Surgery in the Conduct of the surgical clinics. In the year 1865, he gave summer instruction courses. For the next seven years, he worked for the University as Demonstrator of Anatomy. A large portion of his success was due to his wife's energy, intelligence, and determination. She gave him an impetus to try harder and not be satisfied with his first try.

He was elected as a member of the American Philosophical Society in 1872.

Garfield case 
On July 2, 1881, President James A. Garfield was shot by Charles J. Guiteau. He held the position of chief consulting surgeon. When a committee came to give him his money for helping, Agnew said, "Gentlemen, I present no bill for my attendance to President Garfield. I gave my services freely and gratuitously". He was never optimistic about the President's case and was not fooled by fallacious beliefs. This procedure helped create Agnew's reputation.

The Agnew Clinic 
The Agnew Clinic is an 1889 painting by Thomas Eakins which depicts Agnew conducting a mastectomy operation before a gallery of students and doctors.

Accomplishments 
David Agnew wrote The Principles and Practice of Surgery, covers an experience of fifty active years, and its value, preserving and presenting as it does the life-work of such a recognized authority, can hardly be overrated. It was a three-volume set that he published from 1878–1883. He also helped found the Irwin & Agnew Iron Foundry in 1846.

Death 
Agnew caught a severe attack of epidemic influenza in 1890. He never fully recovered. Following this, he had an attack of broncho-vesicular catarrh. On March 9, 1892, he was put to bed for a series of medical problems. After a few days his condition began to improve, but suddenly, on March 12 it became much worse. On March 20, he fell into a comatose condition. Agnew stayed like this until he died at 3:20 p.m. on March 22, 1892. He is now buried in West Laurel Hill Cemetery.

References

Citations

Sources
 Who Was Who in America: Historical Volume, 1607–1896. Chicago: Marquis Who's Who, 1963.

Attribution:

External links

Agnew, D. Hayes. Practical anatomy: a new arrangement of the London dissector, (Philadelphia, 1856). From the Digital Repository of the National Library of Medicine.
History of the Life of D. Hayes Agnew, MD LLD, J. Howe Adams M.D., F.A. Davis Company, Publishers (1892)

1818 births
1892 deaths
Union Army surgeons
Burials at West Laurel Hill Cemetery
Physicians from Philadelphia
University of Pennsylvania faculty
Perelman School of Medicine at the University of Pennsylvania alumni
People from Lancaster County, Pennsylvania